Novokamyshenka is a rural locality (a settlement) in Yekaterininsky Selsoviet, Tretyakovsky District, Altai Krai, Russia. The population was 276 as of 2013. There are 2 streets.

Geography 
Novokamyshenka is located 16 km southeast of Staroaleyskoye (the district's administrative centre) by road. Lopatinka is the nearest rural locality.

References 

Rural localities in Tretyakovsky District